OGC Nice won Division 1 season 1951/1952 of the French Association Football League with 46 points.

Participating teams

 Bordeaux
 Le Havre AC
 RC Lens
 Lille OSC
 Olympique Lyonnais
 Olympique de Marseille
 FC Metz
 FC Nancy
 OGC Nice
 Nîmes Olympique
 RC Paris
 Stade de Reims
 Stade Rennais UC
 CO Roubaix-Tourcoing
 AS Saint-Etienne
 FC Sète
 FC Sochaux-Montbéliard
 RC Strasbourg

Final table

Promoted from Division 2, who will play in Division 1 season 1952/1953
 Stade français (football): Champion of Division 2
 SO Montpellier: Runner-up

Results

Top goalscorers

OGC Nice Winning Squad 1951-'52

Goal
 Marcel Domingo
 Marcel Lupi

Defence
 Ahmed Firoud
 César Hector Gonzales
 Alphonse Martinez
 Serge Pedini
 Guy Poitevin

Midfield
 Jean Belver
 Abdelaziz Ben Tifour
 Désiré Carré
 Léon Rossi

Attack
 Pär Bengtsson
 Antoine Bonifaci
 Luis Carniglia
 Georges Cesari
 Jean Courteaux
 Victor Nuremberg

Management
 Numa Andoire (Coach)

References

 Division 1 season 1951-1952 at pari-et-gagne.com

Ligue 1 seasons
French
1